East Guhuan Island is part of the Philippine territory  adjacent to the island of Sabah in the Sulu Sea,  from Mangsee Island and is part of Barangay Mangsee under the Municipality of Balabac, Province of Palawan, Philippines.

Geography

East Guhuan Island is administered as part of the Balabac barangay of Mangsee.

See also
 List of islands of the Philippines

References

 Book: UNITED STATES COAST PILOT PHILIPPINE ISLANDS "Part II. Palawan, Mindanao and SULU Archipelago" Second Edition 1930 | The Library of the University of Minnesota

Islands of Palawan
Wildlife sanctuaries of the Philippines
Birdwatching sites in the Philippines
Tourist attractions in Palawan